Lon Webb was an American Negro league second baseman in the 1900s.

Webb played for the San Antonio Black Bronchos from 1907 to 1909. In ten recorded career games, he posted eight hits in 42 plate appearances.

References

External links
Baseball statistics and player information from Baseball-Reference Black Baseball Stats and Seamheads

Year of birth missing
Year of death missing
Place of birth missing
Place of death missing
San Antonio Black Bronchos players